The Vero Beach Museum of Art is located at 3001 River Park Drive, Vero Beach, Florida.  It houses regional, state and national art exhibits and includes a sculpture garden. The Vero Beach Museum of Art is the principal cultural arts facility of its kind on Florida's Treasure Coast. The accredited art museum includes art exhibitions, a sculpture garden, studio art and humanities classes, exhibition tours, performances, a museum store, film studies, an art research library, workshops and seminars, children and youth events, and community cultural celebrations.

History
Since 1991, the Vero Beach Museum of Art has been recognized by the State of Florida and the Florida Arts Council as a significant cultural establishment through grant awards and support. The Museum was awarded accreditation from the American Alliance of Museums in April 1997. It became recognized for its professionalism, quality of programming, exhibitions, and community outreach.  The Museum was reaccredited in April 2007.

In 2002, the Museum's Board of Trustees voted to change the institution's name from the Center for the Arts to the Vero Beach Museum of Art, which went into effect on July 1, 2002.

In January 2018, the Museum opened the Art Zone a new interactive Children's Space, which features hands-on activities to encourage children to play and explore as well as a 25-foot-long interactive Sketch Aquarium.

Notes

External links

Websites
Vero Beach Museum of Art (official website)
"Vero Beach Museum of Art, Vero Beach, Florida". Museum Info webpage from MuseumUSA.org.

Art museums and galleries in Florida
Museums in Indian River County, Florida
Buildings and structures in Vero Beach, Florida
Art museums established in 1986
1986 establishments in Florida